The Sippenbuch was a genealogical clan book carried by every member of the SS (Schutzstaffel). This measure was imposed by SS leader Heinrich Himmler to ensure the racial purity of the SS, who he described as a 'racial upper strata of a Germanic people'. Under the Sippenbuch regulations, each member of the SS had to be able to trace their lineage back to 1750 to prove they were of 'Aryan' descent. Prospective marriage partners were required to provide the same evidence about their ancestry.

References

Nazi SS
Identity documents of Nazi Germany